Antimimistis is a genus of moths in the family Geometridae.

Species
 Antimimistis attenuata (Moore, 1887)
 Antimimistis cuprina Prout, 1958
 Antimimistis illaudata Turner, 1922
 Antimimistis subteracta Prout, 1925

References

External links
 

Eupitheciini
Geometridae genera